Consilience: The Unity of Knowledge is a 1998 book by the biologist E. O. Wilson, in which the author discusses methods that have been used to unite the sciences and might in the future unite them with the humanities.
 
Wilson uses the term consilience to describe the synthesis of knowledge from different specialized fields of human endeavor.

Definition of consilience
This book defines consilience as "Literally a 'jumping together' of knowledge by the linking of facts and fact-based theory across disciplines to create a common groundwork of explanation." The word is borrowed from Whewell's phrase the consilience of inductions in his book Philosophy of the Inductive Sciences. Whewell posited that this consilience of inductions occurs when an induction obtained from one class of facts coincides with an induction obtained from a different class. In this way a consilience is a test of the truth of a theory.

Examples of consilience discussed by Wilson

Chapter 1 The Ionian enchantment
 The New Synthesis of Darwin's theory of evolution with genetics is an example of unification. 
 The conviction that the world has a unified order and can be explained by natural laws, was dubbed by Gerald Holton the "Ionian Enchantment".
 Thales of Miletus proposed that water is the unifying basis for all material things. This theory that water is fundamental is often cited as the first materialistic theory of a unified view of nature.
 Unification of forces in the Grand Unified Theory of modern physics.
 Albert Einstein's work provides several examples of unification within the field of physics, for example, unification of Brownian motion with atomic theory.
 Science and religion have a unity of purpose: both want to explain the universe and understand our role in the universe.

Chapter 2 The great branches of learning
 Environmental protection requires the combining of knowledge from government regulators such as the United States Environmental Protection Agency, ethics, social science, biology, and physical sciences like chemistry.
 There is a unity of purpose for philosophy and science. Philosophers and scientists can work together at the borders between biology, social science and the humanities.
 Liberal arts education can be revitalized by the recognition of the unity of knowledge in higher education.
 Government policy requires unified knowledge from across specialized disciplines in the natural sciences, social sciences and humanities.

Chapter 3 The Enlightenment 
 The Enlightenment is discussed in the context of scientific knowledge applied to human rights and social progress.
 Marquis de Condorcet's systematic application of mathematics in the social sciences.
 Francis Bacon was an early advocate of data collection and its analysis as the basis of sound knowledge (Baconian method) in fields that include social science and the humanities.
 René Descartes believed that the universe is rational and united and that interconnected truths run from physics to biology to moral reasoning. Descartes unified geometry and algebra (see: Cartesian coordinate system).
 Isaac Newton unified the Galilei's laws of falling bodies with the laws of Copernicus' planetary motion (see: law of universal gravitation).
 Social science was pioneered by Adolphe Quetelet and Auguste Comte who developed the idea of studying behavior with scientific methods.
 Unity of purpose for Postmodernism and Science. Wilson argues that humanity is driven forward by the tension between those who upon viewing order create disorder and those who upon viewing disorder create order.

Chapter 4 The natural sciences
 The Greek Atomists such as Leucippus and Democritus are credited with the reductionistic idea that matter has fundamental components. Scientific investigation of this idea has resulted in unification across the natural sciences. An example is that the molecular structure of DNA accounts for genetic storage in living cells.
 Experimental Epistemology. Wilson provides a modern attempt to unify neuroscience and epistemology. He proposes it as a method for clarifying the Evolutionary basis of mismatches between physical reality and our mental models of reality.
 Positivism is a method for comparing and unifying knowledge from different disciplines. Priority is given to facts which are generated by experiment and objective observation rather than subjective speculations.
 Pragmatism is a method for comparing and unifying knowledge from different disciplines. Priority is given to methods and techniques that can be demonstrated to work and have pragmatic value.

Chapter 5 Ariadne's thread
 Reduction versus synthesis. Many examples are given comparing consilience by reduction (dissection of a phenomenon into its components) and consilience by synthesis (predicting higher-order phenomena from more basic physical principles). One specific example is Wilson's own work on the chemical signals that regulate insect social behavior.
 An example of consilience by reduction is Wilson's attempt to account for the prevalence of serpent symbols in human cultures. He incorporates the activation-synthesis model of dreaming.
 Consilience between biology disciplines. Wilson discusses the successes (cells explained in terms of their chemical components, embryo development in terms of interactions between the cells of an embryo) but also points to the remaining problem of dealing with complex systems as in neuroscience and ecology.
 Statistical mechanics. A classical example in which the behavior of volumes of gas is explained in terms of the molecules of the gas (kinetic theory).
 Quantum chemistry, the reduction of chemical properties by quantum mechanical calculations.

Chapter 6 The mind
 Explaining consciousness and emotion in terms of brain activity. Wilson describes the neurobiological approach to accounting for consciousness and emotion in terms of brain physiology and how this effort is guided by collaboration between biologists, psychologists and philosophers. 
 Neurobiology of aesthetics. Wilson proposes that it will be possible to construct a neurobiological understanding of subjective experiences that are shared and explored by art. Common neural patterns of activity will be found to correspond to fundamental aesthetic experiences. 
 Artificial emotion. Wilson proposes that human-like artificial intelligence will require the engineering of a computational apparatus for processing an array of rich sensory inputs and the capacity to learn from those inputs in the way that children can learn. Requires consilience between biology, psychology and computer science.

Chapter 7 From genes to culture
 The relationship between genes and culture. Wilson posits that the basic element of culture is the meme. When a meme exists in a brain it has the form of a neuronal network that allows the meme to function within semantic memory. The link from genes to culture is that our genes shape our brains (in cooperation with the environment) and our brains allow us to work with memes as the basic units of culture.

Chapter 8 - 12 
The remaining chapters are titled Chapter 8 The fitness of human nature, Chapter 9 The social sciences, Chapter 10 The arts and their interpretation, Chapter 11 Ethics and religion, Chapter 12 To what end?

See also
 Wendell Berry wrote a comprehensive critique of Consilience in his essay Life is a Miracle in his book with the same title.
 Philosophy of science
 The Two Cultures by C. P. Snow
 The Hedgehog, the Fox, and the Magister's Pox by Stephen Jay Gould

External link

References

Reviews
 Eldredge, Niles and Stephen Jay Gould, "Biology Rules. Review of E.0. Wilson's Consilience, with a supplemented introduction by Richard Morris.". Archive.org 2007 for Stephen Jay Gould Archive.
 
 
 
 
 
 

1998 non-fiction books
American non-fiction books
English-language books
Science books
Science studies
Works by E. O. Wilson